Shazzy Fitness is a Christian centered dance fitness DVD series. This faith-based startup company was initially created by Kristy McCarley in 2012.

Shazzy Fitness is a dance and aerobic workout program. The music in the workout is primarily Christian hip-hop and Christian rock music. Their fitness program is primarily distributed through DVD, though they do offer content through online video sites such as YouTube and Vimeo. The beginning level workouts are designed to train muscle groups and offer a combination of isotonic and isometric dance exercises as well as a cooldown. The intermediate DVD offers the same features but is geared toward dance enthusiasts by offering more advanced dance moves.

Origins
In 2012, McCarley began to work towards the creation of Shazzy Fitness, to create local dance fitness classes that only used Christian music. After additional consideration, Kristy McCarley decided to create a structured video fitness program instead. Shazzy Fitness was named after the story of the Hebrew prophet, Daniel. Kristy states, "since this is a faith-based workout, I wanted to name it after someone who represented strength in faith. I chose Daniel because he is an excellent example of true faith during incredible circumstances. His Babylonian name is Belteshazzar but that's a bit long, so I cut it down to Shazzy."

Instructors
Instructors include Apollo Levine, Vera Musgrove, and Leslie Alison.

Apollo Levine is a professional actor, choreographer, dancer, and musician. He worked on shows such as Dreamgirls, Ragtime, and Smokey Joe's Café. As of May 2014, Apollo is busy making history as the first African American actor starring in the lead role of the original Broadway-style show "The Monkey King" based in Beijing, China. Apollo is also the lead singer for the rock band SteppHeavy, based in McDonough, GA.

Vera Musgrove is a five-year veteran and former captain of the A-Town Dancers of the NBA's Atlanta Hawks. Vera has over 20 years of dance training and performing experience. She has performed at special events including Purple Ribbon Artist, the BET Hip Hop Awards, and for recording artist Bobby Valentino. In December 2011, Vera completed a tour with the theatrical production called DRUMLine Live where she served as captain.

Leslie Alison is the former captain of the Atlanta Hawks Dance Team, and now the owner of Classix Dance Productions. Classix Dance productions is a dance fitness company for seniors ages 50+, and home to Atlanta's official dance team, the ATL Silver Classix Crew.

Reception
Shazzy Fitness's DVDs have generally received favorable reviews. The Chicago Sun Times and Video Librarian praises it for its high-energy and easy choreography. A few critics have commented it may be a bit too easy. Rolling Out Magazine, a news and lifestyle magazine, enjoyed it for its Christian focus and innovative dance moves.

References

External links
 Apollo Levine, Retrieved 21 May 2014.

Companies established in 2012
Physical exercise
Exercise organizations
Exercise-related trademarks